Giuseppe Carcani (c. 1703–1779) was an Italian composer 
of 18th century music. He was born in Crema, and died in Piacenza. He composed works for instruments, organ, and voice. During 
his career, Carcani held positions in at least one cathedral of Italy. Few of his works have survived.

Works 
 Gloria (undated manuscript)
 Pastorale (organ)
 Trio sonata in D major
 La concordia del Tempo colla Fama (Venice, Ospedale degli Incurabili, 1740)

Bibliography 
G. Carcani, Due arie per il soprano Elisabetta Mantovani da "La concordia del Tempo colla Fama" (Venezia, Ospedale degli Incurabili, 28 marzo 1740), a cura di Giovanni Tribuzio, Osaka-shi, Da Vinci Edition, 2017.

References

1700s births
1779 deaths
Year of birth uncertain
People from Crema, Lombardy
18th-century Italian composers
Italian male composers
18th-century Italian musicians
18th-century composers
18th-century Italian male musicians
Musicians from the Province of Cremona